Magali Mocquery (born 20 September 1983) is a road cyclist from France. She represented her nation at the 2007 UCI Road World Championships.

References

External links
 

1983 births
French female cyclists
Living people
Sportspeople from Haute-Savoie
Cyclists from Auvergne-Rhône-Alpes